Mircea Constantinescu (born 25 February 1945) is a Romanian former footballer who played as a goalkeeper for Politehnica Iași, Dinamo București and SC Bacău.

Club career
Mircea Constantinescu was born on 25 February 1945 in Crăiești, Romania, and made his Divizia A debut on 20 October 1963, playing for Politehnica Iași in a 5–3 away loss against Progresul București. He spent 7 seasons at Politehnica, a period in which the club had a relegation to Divizia B, but he helped the club gain the promotion back to Divizia A after one season and in 1970 he went to play for Dinamo București where he won the title in his first season, contributing with 27 matches played. He won two more titles, at the first contributing with 10 appearances and at the second with 32 games played. After 7 seasons spent with The Red Dogs in which he played a total of 110  matches and appeared in 11 European competitions games (including four matches in the Inter-Cities Fairs Cup), Constantinescu ended his career by spending one season at SC Bacău, making his last Divizia A appearance on 26 June 1977 in a 2–0 home victory against Sportul Studențesc București, having a total of 287 matches played in the competition. After he retired from playing football, Constantinescu became a referee, arbitrating matches in Romania's top-league Divizia A.

International career
Mircea Constantinescu played two friendly matches for Romania, making his debut under coach Bazil Marian in a 1–1 against Uruguay, which took place in Montevideo on Estadio Gran Parque Central. His second game was a 2–1 away victory against Greece.

Honours
Politehnica Iași
Divizia B: 1967–68
Dinamo București
Divizia A: 1970–71, 1972–73, 1974–75

References

1945 births
Living people
Romanian footballers
Romania international footballers
Association football goalkeepers
Liga I players
Liga II players
FC Politehnica Iași (1945) players
FC Dinamo București players
FCM Bacău players
Romanian football referees